Fernand Gonder (12 June 1883 – 10 March 1969) was a French pole vaulter. He won the gold medal at the 1906 Intercalated Games and finished 15th at the 1912 Summer Olympics. He was the French champion in 1904, 1905, 1913 and 1914, finishing second in 1912.

References

1883 births
1969 deaths
French male pole vaulters
Athletes (track and field) at the 1906 Intercalated Games
Athletes (track and field) at the 1912 Summer Olympics
Olympic athletes of France
Medalists at the 1906 Intercalated Games
19th-century French people
20th-century French people